The Krakės-Dotnuva Forest is a forest in Kėdainiai District Municipality, central Lithuania, located 1.5 km from Krakės and 4 km from Dotnuva. It covers 32.8 km2 area. The rivers Jaugila, Smilgaitis, Tranys, Girotakis drain the forest. 

As of 2005, 38 % of the area was covered by birch, 25 % by spruce, 13 % by aspen, 8 % by ash, 7 % by oak tree groups. The fauna of the forest consists of moose, wild boar, roe deer, red deer, also there are beavers, black storks, middle spotted woodpeckers. The forest is included into Dotnuva-Josvainiai Biosphere Polygon.

References

Forests of Lithuania
Kėdainiai District Municipality